Events in the year 1975 in Norway.

Incumbents
 Monarch – Olav V
 Prime Minister – Trygve Bratteli (Labour Party)

Events

 1 January – Advertising of alcohol and tobacco products are prohibited.
 NRK started television broadcasts in color.
 Municipal and county elections are held throughout the country.
 July 29 to August 7 – 14th World Scout Jamboree, Lillehammer

Popular culture

Sports

Music

Film

Literature
Stein Mehren, poet, novelist, essayist and playwright, is awarded the Riksmål Society Literature Prize.

Notable births
 
 
 
 

9 January – Rolf Bae, mountaineer (d.2008).
11 January – Trine Bakke, alpine skier.
23 January – Ingeborg Helen Marken, alpine skier.
26 January – Tonje Larsen, handball player.
1 March – Heidi Gjermundsen Broch, actress and singer.
4 March – Mats Eilertsen, jazz musician.
12 March – Cecilie Leganger, handball player.
25 March 
Monica Knudsen, footballer.
Lisa Stokke, singer and actress
28 March – Wenche-Lin Hess, archer.
9 April – Bertine Zetlitz, pop singer.
23 April 
Stine Brun Kjeldaas, snowboarder.
Helge Lien, jazz pianist, composer and band leader.
24 April – Marte Mjøs Persen, politician.
30 April – Kristin Roskifte, illustrator and author of picture books.
8 May – Anna Ceselie Brustad Moe, politician
18 May – Ingvild Kjerkol, politician.
26 May – Marte Michelet, journalist, critic and non-fiction writer.
29 May – Gunnar Garfors, media professional, traveller, and author
30 May – Synne Sun Løes, novelist and children's writer.
3 June – Christine Bøe Jensen, footballer.
21 June – Tone Gunn Frustøl, footballer.
20 July – Erik Hagen, footballer.
25 July – Håvard Ellefsen, also known as Mortiis, black metal musician
1 August – Ane Dahl Torp, actress.
2 August – Lars Petter Hagen, actress.
7 August – Gaahl (Kristian Eivind Espedal), black metal musician
2 September – Daniel Skjeldam, business executive.
19 September – Anna Bache-Wiig, actress and writer.
26 September – Anna Børve Jenssen, newspaper editor.
12 October – Marianne Beate Kielland, mezzo-soprano.
28 October – Aksel Hennie, actor.
1 November – Lise Myhre, cartoonist.
5 November – Abid Raja, jurist and politician.
14 November – Nicolai Cleve Broch, actor.
19 November – Kristine Kristiansen, alpine skier.
24 November – Marian Saastad Ottesen, actress.
27 November – Frode Nymo, jazz musician.
28 November – Jenny Klinge, politician.
4 December – Ellen Dorrit Petersen, actress.

Full date unknown
Frode Haltli, accordion player

Notable deaths

15 January – Edmund Fjærvoll, politician (b.1910)
15 January – Håkon Tønsager, rower (b.1890)
28 January – Ola Raknes, psychoanalyst and philologist (b.1887)
1 February – Martin Smeby, politician (b.1891)
5 February – Kristian Fjerdingen, gymnast and Olympic gold medallist (b.1884).
22 February – Brynhild Berge, diver (b.1901)
14 March – Oddvar Sponberg, race walker (b.1914)
12 April – Alf Andersen, ski jumper and Olympic gold medallist (b.1906)
16 April – Oscar Larsen, middle-distance runner (b.1887)
23 April – Ole Stenen, Nordic skier, Olympic silver medallist and World Champion (b.1903).
29 April – Torleiv Corneliussen, sailor and Olympic gold medallist (b.1890)
5 May – Nils Eriksen, international soccer player and Olympic bronze medallist (b.1911)
15 May – Einar Iveland, politician (b.1892).  
5 June – Ivar Skjånes, politician (b.1888)
11 June – Karl Lunde, politician (b.1892)
3 July – Arne Halse, athlete and Olympic silver medallist (b.1887)
24 July – Frithjof Andersen, wrestler and Olympic bronze medallist (b.1893).
27 July – Kristian Welhaven, chief of the Oslo police force 1927–1954 (b.1883)
10 August – Andreas Backer, journalist and organizational leader (born 1895).
14 August – Einar Normann Rasmussen, politician (b.1907)
18 August – Odd Lindbäck-Larsen, military officer and war historian (b.1897)
24 August – Oskar Steinvik, politician (b.1908)
26 August – Olaf Holtedahl, geologist (b.1885)
6 September – Kristoffer Nilsen, boxer (b.1901)
8 October – Frithjof Sælen, gymnast and Olympic gold medallist (b.1892)
11 October – Henry Karlsen, politician (b.1912)
12 October – Peder Kjellberg, boxer (b.1902)
26 December – Salve Andreas Salvesen, politician (b.1909)

Full date unknown
Kornelius Bergsvik, politician (b.1889)
Thor Bjørklund, carpenter and inventor of the cheese slicer (b.1889)
Thorleif Christoffersen, sailor and Olympic gold medallist (b.1900)
Johan Faye, sailor and Olympic silver medallist (b.1889)
Peder Furubotn, cabinetmaker and politician (b.1890)
Johan Peter Holtsmark, physicist (b.1894)
Rolf Kiær, hydrographer (b.1897)
Egil Offenberg, politician and Minister (b.1899)
Toralv Øksnevad, politician, journalist, newspaper editor and radio personality (b.1891)
Bjart Ording, horse rider and Olympic silver medallist (b.1898)
Øystein Olsen Ravner, politician (b.1893)
Aimée Sommerfelt, author (b.1892)

See also

References

External links